Plaumanniella novateutoniae is a species of beetle in the family Cerambycidae, and the only species in the genus Plaumanniella. It was described by Fisher in 1938.

References

Parmenini
Beetles described in 1938